Government Girls General Degree College, Ekbalpur, established in 2016, is an undergraduate women's college in Ekbalpur, Kolkata. It offers undergraduate courses in arts and science. This college is affiliated to University of Calcutta.

Departments

Arts

Bengali
English
Arabic
Persian
Urdu
History
Political Science
Sociology

Science
Mathematics
Geography
Physics
Chemistry
Economics

Commerce
 B.Com

See also 
List of colleges affiliated to the University of Calcutta
Education in India
Education in West Bengal

References

External links
 Government Girls General Degree College, Ekbalpur

Women's universities and colleges in West Bengal
University of Calcutta affiliates
Educational institutions established in 2016
2016 establishments in West Bengal
Universities and colleges in Kolkata